"Jet Fuel Formula" is the first and the longest  Rocky and Bullwinkle story arc and is the pilot of The Adventures of Rocky and Bullwinkle and Friends. (Jet Fuel Formula covers forty episodes while the average story arc includes approximately sixteen.) It is also noteworthy in that it established most of the characters, themes, running gags, and other elements that would be employed in later stories and that would become so closely identified with the Rocky and Bullwinkle programs in the years since. The first few episodes contained a laugh track, which was removed when the episodes were released as part of Rocky & Bullwinkle & Friends Complete Season 1.

In spite of the title, the story actually concerns the pursuit of a formula for rocket fuel.

Broadcast history

The first and second episodes of Jet Fuel Formula first aired on Thursday, November 19, 1959, as part of the series premiere of Rocky and His Friends on the ABC television network. Two new episodes were broadcast as part of each week's show. Sources are at odds regarding the broadcast of the final episodes, with at least one reporting April 1, 1960 (a Friday) and another April 3 (a Sunday). Published television listings indicate that the series aired on Thursdays throughout the run of Jet Fuel Formula, suggesting that the final episodes (39 and 40) likely aired on March 31 or, perhaps, April 7.

Plot
As with many subsequent Rocky and Bullwinkle adventures, the title characters stumble into an absurd situation, which leads to a sequence of further absurd situations.

Rocky and Bullwinkle attempt to bake a Mooseberry fudge cake using Grandma Bullwinkle's recipe, unaware that the raw cake batter is actually a revolutionary rocket fuel. While attempting to light the old-fashioned oven Bullwinkle ignites the first layer, launching the oven to the Moon.

In order to retrieve the appliance, they build their own rocket ship and use the remaining cake layers to propel them to the moon and then back to Earth. Upon their return, the U.S. government places Bullwinkle in charge of "moosile" research and he sets about to recreate the cake recipe, half of which was destroyed in the initial explosion. Two Moon Men, Gidney and Cloyd, arrive to prevent Bullwinkle from recreating the formula, as they fear an invasion of tourists from Earth. Hypnotized by Boris, Bullwinkle is able to remember the recipe.

However, by the time he does so Boris has fallen asleep, and when Bullwinkle reveals the formula he is "scrootched" (frozen) by the Moon Men. Boris then steals the frozen Bullwinkle. When he revives Boris puts him to work in a new lab where he remembers the new recipe is "2 cups of flour, a pound of kumquats and a hat full of vanilla to give it character" along with "3oz of methylene bromide and a cube of diphenyl phosphate and now a dozen benzochloranes". Boris transmits the moose's research to his superiors, who are blown up trying to repeat it. He also attempts to immobilize the Moon Men with sleeping pills. Rocky rescues Bullwinkle and the Moon Men. Gidney and Cloyd become media celebrities but soon tire of their fame. They insist that Rocky and Bullwinkle return to the Moon with them, but their ship's fuel has been stolen by Boris.

Rocky and Bullwinkle agree to help make more fuel, and they head to Frostbite Falls to procure the secret ingredient: mooseberries. Boris sends the Moon Men's stolen fuel to Pottsylvania, but it explodes upon arrival, leveling the seaport. Boris kidnaps Rocky and Bullwinkle en route to Minnesota by posing as a pilot offering to fly them home. They crash land near Frostbite Falls, only to find that a blight has decimated the mooseberry crop. Bullwinkle manages to obtain the only remaining bush, which is promptly stolen by Boris.

Rocky and Bullwinkle telephone the Moon Men, who have become popular entertainers, and ask for their help in obtaining another mooseberry bush. They book passage on an ocean liner to Pottsylvania, the only remaining source of mooseberries. Boris and Natasha have stolen tickets for the same trip in order to return to their homeland with the stolen bush. The incompetent Peter Peachfuzz, captain of the liner S.S. Andalusia, steers the ship to Holland, Antarctica, and Perth Amboy. When their mooseberry bush appears to be ailing Boris and Natasha harvest the berries.

As food supplies aboard the ship have dwindled during the erratic voyage a famished Bullwinkle eats the berries which, once picked, have become extremely volatile. He survives the resulting explosion. The ship runs aground on a tropical island. While Rocky, Bullwinkle, and Peachfuzz go ashore Boris steals the Andalusia, but is ordered to return for Bullwinkle. When they arrive in Pottsylvania Boris meets with Fearless Leader and reveals his plan to use the rocket fuel to establish a television transmitter on the moon and to jam American broadcasts with Pottsylvanian commercials.

Rocky and Bullwinkle begin an expedition to find a mooseberry bush, which grows on Pottsylvania's highest mountain, Wynchataka Peak. They engage a disguised Boris and Natasha as guides and retrieve a lone mooseberry bush from the mountainside. The group encounters an Abominable Snowman, which turns out to be Gidney and Cloyd in disguise. The Moon Men hope to use the bush to make fuel for a return trip to the Moon, while Rocky plans to turn it over to the U.S. government. They escape Pottsylvania and sail for the United States.

Rocky hatches a plan to send the Moon Men home while also providing the government with rocket fuel, and he proposes to have Gidney and Cloyd naturalized as American citizens who could then become the first Americans on the Moon, with the help of the mooseberry rocket fuel.

Senator Fussmussen, who feels that the recent admission of Alaska and Hawaii has created too many new Americans, purposely turns the citizenship exam into an interrogation, which (coupled with Rocky and Bullwinkle's useless studying aids) result in Gidney and Cloyd failing. The two are deported—to the Moon. Bullwinkle makes a batch of fuel and the Moon Men return home, with Senator Fussmussen (too dignified to remove his coat after it gets caught in the door) in tow as the new ambassador to the moon.

Characters
It is not unusual for characters and other elements of any television program, animated or live-action, to undergo development during the course of the series (see "Black Smithers"). Nonetheless, it is noteworthy to observe how quickly some of the major Rocky and Bullwinkle characters developed from relatively flat and marginally recognizable figures into the iconic "personalities" that remain popular a half-century later.

Rocket J. Squirrel: A "plucky squirrel" from the start, far more intelligent than his partner yet still often a bit naive, little changed other than slight details of Rocky's flight helmet.

Bullwinkle J. Moose: While already a well-meaning goofus, the early Bullwinkle is relatively subdued. His mouth alternates locations during the early episodes before settling beneath his nose.

Boris Badenov: Boris begins as much more of a traditional villain, even a menacing presence; in the earliest episodes his eyes are red and he has a more demonic appearance. By the fourth episode he has developed into a more comic character and dons his first disguise—a swami intent on hypnotizing Bullwinkle. Amusingly, his eyes are white after waking up from a long slumber, as though the redness was caused by sleep deprivation.

Natasha Fatale: Although Natasha is a femme fatale from her first appearance she becomes slightly more curvaceous during the course of the early episodes. In Jet Fuel Formula her last name is pronounced “Fuh-TAH-lee”, although in the second story arc it is pronounced "Fuh-TAHL".

Fearless Leader: In his first appearance, Fearless Leader is a physically nondescript, heavyset character. Toward the end of this story arc he transforms into the thin, scarred, monocle-wearing character whose name has become a catch phrase.

Peter "Wrongway" Peachfuzz: Captain Peachfuzz's physical appearance is consistent from the start, along with his depiction as an incompetent sailor. However, in Jet Fuel Formula he has not yet taken on his familiar Ed Wynn-esque voice; rather, his speech is reminiscent of a stereotypical cartoon parrot. He has command of the passenger liner S.S. Andalusia only because he purchased the ship with an inheritance.

Gidney & Cloyd: Moon Men sent to Earth by their people to prevent an influx of Earth tourists. Gidney has a mustache, while Cloyd carries a "scrootch gun".

Narrator: Like Bullwinkle, the Narrator is somewhat subdued in the earliest episodes, speaking almost as if he is letting the audience in on a secret. He quickly develops a more melodramatic style appropriate to the pulp serial style of the show and its ubiquitous cliffhangers.

Episode segments

Episode 1
 Jet Fuel Formula
 Fractured Fairy Tales: Rapunzel
 Bullwinkle's Corner: "The Swing" by Robert Louis Stevenson
 Peabody's Improbable History: Show Opening
 Bullwinkle's Ride or Goodbye Dollink

Episode 2
 Bullseye Bullwinkle or Destination Moose
 Fractured Fairy Tales: Puss In Boots
 Bullwinkle's Corner: "Little Miss Muffet"
 Peabody's Improbable History: Napoleon
 Squeeze Play or Invitation to the Trance

Episode 3
 The Scrooched Moose 
 Fractured Fairy Tales: The Fisherman's Wishes
 Bullwinkle's Corner: "The Horn"
 Peabody's Improbable History: Lord Nelson
 Monitored Moose or The Carbon Copy Cats

Episode 4
 Rocky's Dilemma or A Squirrel In A Stew
 Fractured Fairy Tales: Goldilocks
 Bullwinkle's Corner: "Where Go The Boats"
 Peabody's Improbable History: Wyatt Earp
 The Submarine Squirrel or 20,000 Leagues Beneath the Sea

Episode 5
 Bars and Stripes Forever
 Fractured Fairy Tales: Fe-Fi-Fo-Fum
 Bullwinkle's Corner: "My Shadow"
 Peabody's Improbable History: King Arthur
 Hello Out There! or There's No Place Like Space

Episode 6
 A Creep At The Deep or Will Success Spoil Boris Badenov?
 Fractured Fairy Tales: Beauty and the Beast
 Bullwinkle's Corner: "I Love Little Pussy" (featuring a tiger)
 Peabody's Improbable History: Franz Schubert
 Ace Is Wild or The Flying Casket

Episode 7
 The Back Seat Divers or Mashed Landing
 Fractured Fairy Tales: The Brave Little Tailor or T-shirt Tall
 Bullwinkle's Corner: "Taffy"
 Peabody's Improbable History: Lucrezia Borgia
 Bullwinkle's Water Follies or Antlers Aweigh

Episode 8
 The Inspector-Detector or A Kick in the Plants 
 Fractured Fairy Tales: Rumpelstiltskin
 Bullwinkle's Corner: "Wee Willie Winkie"
 Peabody's Improbable History: Sir Walter Raleigh
 Canoes Who? or Look before you leak.

Episode 9
 Two For the Ripsaw or Goodbye, Mr Chips
 Aesop and Son: The Lion and the Mouse
 Bullwinkle's Corner: "Little Jack Horner"
 Peabody's Improbable History: Robert Fulton
 Farewell, My Ugly or Knots to You

Episode 10
 Cheerful Little Pierful or Bomb Voyage
 Fractured Fairy Tales: The Princess and the Pea
 Bullwinkle's Corner: "The Queen of Hearts"
 Peabody's Improbable History: Annie Oakley
 Summer Squash or He's Too Flat for Me

Episode 11
 The Earl and the Squirrel or The March of Crime
 Fractured Fairy Tales: Sweet Little Beat
 Bullwinkle's Corner: Tom-Tom The Piper's Son
 Dudley Do-Right: The Disloyal Canadians
 A Drift in the Mist or Fog Groggy

Episode 12
 The Deep Six or The Old Moose and the Sea
 Fractured Fairy Tales: The Fisherman and his Wife
 Mr. Know-It-All: How To Train a Doggie
 Peabody's Improbable History: Jessie James
 The Slippery Helm or Captain's Outrageous

Episode 13
 Bullwinkle Makes a Hit or I Get a Bang out of You
 Aesop and Son: The Mice Who Belled The Cat or The Mice In Council
 Bullwinkle's Corner: "Barbara Frietchie"
 Peabody's Improbable History: The Wright Brothers
 Three on an Island or Tell It to the Maroons

Episode 14
 Dancing on Air or The Pottsylvania Polka
 Fractured Fairy Tales: Dick Whittington's Cat
 Mr. Know-It-All: How To Train a Lion
 Peabody's Improbable History: George Armstrong Custer
 Axe Me Another or Heads You Lose!

Episode 15
 The Pen Pals or Rock Hocky Rocky
 Fractured Fairy Tales: Cinderella
 Mr. Know-It-All: How To Cook A Turkey's Goose
 Peabody's Improbable History: Alfred Nobel
 The Fright-Seeing Trip or Visit to a Small Panic

Episode 16
 Boris Burgles Again or Sinner Take All
 Fractured Fairy Tales: The Shoemaker and the Elves
 Mr. Know-It-All: Swimming Can Be Fun (and Wet)
 Dudley Do-Right: Stokey The Bear
 Dander Ahead or Watch Out for Falling Rockys

Episode 17
 Avalanche is Better Than None or Snows Your Old Man
 Aesop and Son: The Fox and the Stork
 Mr. Know-It-All: How To Sell Vacuum Cleaners (and Clean Up)
 Peabody's Improbable History: Marco Polo
 Below Zero Heroes or I Only Have Ice for You

Episode 18
 The Snowman Cometh or An Icicle Built for Two
 Fractured Fairy Tales: Tom Thumb (I)
 Mr. Know-It-All: How To Cure the Hiccups
 Dudley Do-Right: Mortgagin' The Mountie Post
 The Moonman Is Blue or The Inside Story

Episode 19
 Fuels Rush In or Star Spangled Boner
 Aesop and Son: The Sheep in Wolf's Clothing
 Mr. Know-It-All: How to Open a Jar of Pickles
 Peabody's Improbable History: Richard the Lionhearted
 The Pottsylvania Permanent or I've Grown Accustomed to the Place

Episode 20
 The Boundary Bounders or Some Like It Shot
 Fractured Fairy Tales: Sir Galahad or The Tomorrow Knight
 Mr. Know-It-All: How To Get Into the Movies (without Buying a Ticket)
 Peabody's Improbable History: Don Juan
 The Washington Whirl or Rocky off the Record

Themes

Cold War
Jet Fuel Formula makes numerous allusions to the Cold War, a theme that would become a recurring element of the Rocky and Bullwinkle stories. The fictional nation of Pottsylvania stands in for East Germany, with its character influenced by the Cold War-era Soviet Union and Nazi Germany (for instance, many Pottsylvanian accents are more Germanic than Russian). Pottsylvania is a closed, repressive nation ruled by the Fuehrer-esque Fearless Leader and the mysterious Mr. Big. The United States, on the other hand, is directly satired as an absurd bureaucracy with pompous politicians (such as Senator Fussmussen) and incompetent bureaucrats (typified by Peter Peachfuzz). The themes of the arms race, the space race, international technological competition, and espionage are found throughout the story.

Boris's disguises
Jet Fuel Formula establishes the running gag in which Boris, and often Natasha, don disguises in order to advance their plot against Rocky and Bullwinkle. The disguised Boris typically presents himself to the heroes, and to the audience, by announcing, "Allow me to introduce myself, I'm—". The name is often a pun on the name of a celebrity of the time, some of whom may be obscure to 21st century viewers. Much of the humor of these scenes comes from the fact that, although disguised, Boris remains instantly recognizable (to the audience), and his aliases are often thinly-veiled puns on his real name. Rocky often remarks that Boris's voice sounds familiar, yet he and Bullwinkle are consistently duped. In Jet Fuel Formula Boris's disguises include:

Swami Ben Boris, hypnotist; Natasha plays his unnamed assistant.
Sir Thomas Lippenboris, millionaire yachtsman (a reference to Thomas Lipton, founder of Lipton Tea); Natasha poses as "Lady Alice"
Sir Hillary Pushemoff (Push Them Off), mountain climber (a reference to Edmund Hillary); Natasha is disguised as his Native American companion, Princess Bubbling Spring That Runs In The Meadow
A Scientist
A Federal Plant Inspector
Ace Rickenboris, pilot (a reference to World War I flying ace Eddie Rickenbacker); Natasha is his stewardess, Miss Callahan.
Clarence Darronov, lawyer (a reference to Clarence Darrow)
An Indian canoeist.
A Pottsylvanian taxi driver; Natasha plays his partner, Spike
Barnacle Boris Badenov, sea captain (a reference to the song Barnacle Bill)

Lampooning the medium and breaking the fourth wall

Jet Fuel Formula lampoons the medium of television and, particularly, television commercials, which are depicted as being so odious as to be used as weapons by warring nations. The conventions of television are a source for parody, as well as its quality. The characters frequently break the fourth wall to address the audience. This is particularly evident in some of the short supporting features, such as Mr. Know-It-All and Bullwinkle's Corner, in which the audience sees backstage areas, light rigs, etc., and in which Rocky, Bullwinkle and particularly Boris portray characters distinct from their roles in the actual Rocky and Bullwinkle segments. Rocky and Bullwinkle may be viewed as an early, animated example of metafiction, insofar as the characters make frequent reference to the fact that they are, in fact, characters engaged in the presentation of a work of fiction.  In one brief scene Capt. Peachfuzz is seen reading a Mr. Peabody comic book. Natasha and Bullwinkle each reckon the passage of time in terms of episodes. Rocky and Bullwinkle respond to comments made by the narrator, and Boris chides him for revealing plot details.

"Our next episode"

The first episode ends with a teaser promoting the next episode with a now-familiar "double title" (Bullwinkle's Ride or Goodbye, Dollink). IMDb uses these "titles" to label individual episodes, but on the Rocky and Bullwinkle DVDs they are simply numbered 1 through 40, suggesting that the titles are to be viewed as a gag rather than as an actual label for the subsequent episode. Many involve cultural references—sometimes rather obscure—and often dreadful puns.

Limited animation

Rocky and Bullwinkle has long been held in high esteem for its witty, even sophisticated writing. But in contrast, the visual portion of the show is a prime example of limited animation, and as such it has been called "a well-written radio program with pictures". Some elements, such as the almost childlike quality of much of the scenery, might today be regarded as an integral part of the "look" of the show, but were in fact the product of severe financial limitations which required that animation be outsourced to a second-tier studio in Mexico. It might be expected that the animation of the earliest episodes would be even more "limited" than what followed. An exhaustive listing of continuity errors in Jet Fuel Formula would be beyond the scope of this article; however, it is common to see Boris's mustache disappear and reappear from moment to moment and for buildings and other background objects (such as the Polynesian hamburger stand visited by the passengers of the Andalusia) to completely change their appearance from one scene to the next.

The adult demographic

As noted above, Rocky and Bullwinkle is acclaimed for the quality of its writing rather than its animation. While the slapstick, "cartoonish" elements of the program may appeal to children the ongoing popularity of the program is due rather to the wit and sophistication of its writing. From the earliest episodes Rocky and Bullwinkle included absurd, anarchic humor aimed primarily at adults rather than children. Five years before Dr. Strangelove, Jet Fuel Formula was satirizing the American military and government, most notably in the person of Capt. Peter "Wrong Way" Peachfuzz but also in other characters and situations throughout the story. In fact, Jet Fuel Formula may be viewed as a 40-episode satire of Cold War sensibilities, at a time when such topics were generally viewed with grave seriousness (see Duck and Cover). In addition to political matters, Rocky and Bullwinkle cartoons include an almost-constant barrage of cultural references. While many may be unfamiliar to a 21st-century audience, some likely were obscure from the start and include references to turn-of-the-century stage comedies and old popular songs. Boris's disguises make reference to Edmund Hillary, Eddie Rickenbacker, and Clarence Darrow, as well as to the profane folk song, Barnacle Bill the Sailor. Furthermore, Bullwinkle's difficulty in speaking the name of Boris's "uncle" (actually the mooseberry bush in disguise) makes reference to the fact, likely unfamiliar to many Americans, that although pronounced "Chumly" the name is actually spelled "Cholmondeley". The "titles" given as teasers for upcoming episodes include references to 1930 Broadway (Cheerful Little Earful), classic literature (James Hilton's Goodbye, Mr. Chips, Ernest Hemingway's The Old Man and the Sea, Rudyard Kipling's Captains Courageous, and William Faulkner's Go Down, Moses—the latter of which could also be read as a reference to the African-American Spiritual), two polka standards (Too Fat Polka and Pennsylvania Polka), early 20th century musical comedy (The Earl and the Girl), classic American drama (Eugene O'Neill's The Iceman Cometh), as well as contemporary films, such as Some Like It Hot, The Moon Is Blue, and Visit to a Small Planet.

Credits

A Jay Ward Production
Producers: Jay Ward, Bill Scott
Executive producer: Ponsonby Britt
Directors: Gerard Baldwin,  Jim Hiltz, Bill Hurtz, Ted Parmelee, Gerry Ray, Dun Roman, Rudy Zamora
Writers: George Atkins, Jim Critenfield, Chris Hayward, Chris Jenkins (or Jenkyns), Bill Scott
Animation: Gamma Productions
Associate Producer: Edwin A. Gourley
Voice Actors: June Foray (Rocky, Natasha), Paul Frees (Boris, Peter Peachfuzz, Cloyd), Bill Conrad (narrator), Bill Scott (uncredited as Bullwinkle, Fearless Leader, Gidney)
Design and Layout: Sam Clayberger, Dave Fern, Frank Hursh, Dan Jurovich, Joe Montell, Roy Morita, Al Shean, Shirley Silvey, Sam Weiss, Al Wilson
Supervised by: Harvey Siegal
Music: Frank Comstock, Dennis Farnon
"And a host of others": Barbara Baldwin, Skip Craig, Adrienne Diamond, Art Diamond, Roger Donley, Sal Faillace, Carlos Manríquez, Jesus Martínez, Bob Maxfield, Dun Roman, Jean Washam
Misc.: William Schleh

(This listing is based on a cross reference of the actual series credits that appeared at the end of each installment of Rocky and His Friends and the sometimes more exhaustive credits posted at IMDb. Individuals known to be involved solely with the supporting features (e.g., Hans Conried, the voice of Snidely Whiplash, and Edward Everett Horton, the narrator of Fractured Fairy Tales) are not listed here.)

Home video

Jet Fuel Formula was released on DVD on August 5, 2003 as part of Rocky & Bullwinkle & Friends Complete Season 1. This 4-disc set includes both Jet Fuel Formula and Box Top Robbery (the other season 1 story arc) in their entirety, along with all supporting features from the first season (1959–1960).

References

Jay Ward & Bill Scott, producers (2003), Rocky & Bullwinkle & Friends Complete Season 1 DVD. Classic Media/Sony Wonder. ASIN: B00009PJT0.

External links
 

 
 

The Adventures of Rocky and Bullwinkle and Friends episodes
1959 American television episodes
1960 American television episodes